The following are the national records in Olympic weightlifting in Cameroon. Records are maintained in each weight class for the snatch lift, clean and jerk lift, and the total for both lifts by the Fédération Camerounaise d'Haltérophilie et de Culturisme.

Current records

Men

Women

References

Cameroon
Records
weightlifting